Mrisho S.H. Sarakikya was the first chief of the Tanzania People's Defence Force (TPDF). He was given command of the TPDF soon after the army mutiny of 1964, when either a captain (Reuters 1967) or a lieutenant (Kaplan 1978).

Early life
He was born at Meru, Tanzania in 1934. He attended Nkoaranga Lutheran Primary School and then moving on to Old Moshi secondary school. Due to his performance he was then invited to the prestigious Tabora Government Secondary School. Once graduating, he entered the Tanzanian portion of the King's African Rifles as a private in 1958; and later attended the Royal Military Academy Sandhurst.

Military career
During the mutiny within the newly form Tanganyika Rifles in 1964, Sarakikya was in Tabora and remained loyal to Nyerere. Following the aftermath, other senior officers were dismissed or sacked and he was given command of the newly formed Tanzania People's Defence Force. From 1964 to 1974, he commanded the TPDF. He was succeeded by Lieutenant General Abdallah Twalipo.

References

Tanzanian generals